Tianjin–Baoding intercity railway, also known as Tianjin-Baoding Passenger Line, is a high-speed railway line connecting Tianjin with Baoding in Hebei province. The project was jointly developed by the Ministry of Railways, Tianjin and Hebei Provincial Governments, supplying a total investment of 24 billion yuan. Construction began in March 2010 and the original plan was to be opened to traffic in 2013, however the progress of construction has experienced numerous work stoppages with completion delayed until December 28, 2015. Future high speed rail connections have been proposed such as a branch to the new Beijing Daxing International Airport, allowing this airport to better serve the greater Beijing-Tianjin-Hebei region.

Profile
The limits of this project is from Tianjin West railway station and finally to Baoding Station in Hebei. The project includes, in addition to the new Tianjin–Baoding intercity railway, also includes short sections and connections to the Beijing-Guangzhou HSR, the Beijing–Kowloon Railway, Beijing–Shanghai Railway, Beijing-Shanghai HSR and other ancillary works. Stations located along the route will be Tianjin West, Shengfang, Bazhou West, Baigou, Baiyangdian, Xushui and ending at Baoding. Most of the new trackage will be on an elevated viaduct, accounting for 65.4% of the line of the being on bridges.

Construction
 November 8, 2008 - the Ministry of Railways, Tianjin and Hebei Provincial government tripartite released the "Speed up the construction of the railway from Tianjin to Baoding Minutes" at a signing ceremony, clears the way for construction of the Tianjin–Baoding intercity railway. Which at full-length, will be , with a total investment of 24 billion yuan estimate. It was expected to start in the first half of 2009, however, consultation had not yet started for construction to begin on schedule. 
 March 17, 2010 - Tianjin Municipal Government, said that after the enthusiasm, the National Development and Reform Commission officially approved the Tianjin-Baoding railway project approved.
 March 2010 - Officially started construction, with an expectation to be completed in 2013, will be realized from Tianjin to Baoding accessible within one hour.
 December 28, 2015 - Opened to traffic

Work stoppages
 July 23, 2011 - In the event of the Wenzhou train collision, the Ministry of Railways called for all railway construction, investment and other works regarding to high-speed rail to be halted, pending further reviews. Thus Ministry of Railways investment for this railway was halted and it fell into a suspended state.
 March 2012, Construction was fully resumed, originally scheduled for completion in 2013 but now delayed until 2015.

References

High-speed railway lines in China
Rail transport in Hebei
Rail transport in Tianjin
Standard gauge railways in China
Railway lines opened in 2015
Baoding